is a 1991 film based on the television jidaigeki Hissatsu Shigotonin series. The film is an occasionally whimsical Japanese drama about assassins. The film was directed by Toshio Masuda.

Plot

Cast
 Makoto Fujita as Mondo Nakamura
 Kunihiko Mitamura as Hide
 Hiroaki Murakami as Masa
 Yasuko Mitsumoto as Outa
 Youichi Yamamoto as Yumeji
 Kin Sugai as Sen Nakamura
 Mari Shiraki as Ritsu Nakamura
 Megumi Asaoka as Sada
 Noriko Sakai as Oasa
 Ittoku Kishibe
 Yoko Yamamoto as Goto Chitose

References

External links

1991 films
1990s adventure films
1990s Japanese-language films
Jidaigeki films
1980s Japanese films
1990s Japanese films